Bid Gol may refer to:
Bid Gol, Chaharmahal and Bakhtiari
Bid Gol, Fars
Bid Gol, Kermanshah
Bid Gol, Lorestan
Bidgol